Robert Aitken may refer to:

Science and medicine
 Robert Grant Aitken (1864–1951), American astronomer
 Robert Aitken (dermatologist) (1888–1954) Scottish dermatologist
 Sir Robert Aitken (university administrator) (1901–1997), New Zealand physician and university administrator
 John Aitken (biologist) (Robert John Aitken; born 1947), Australian reproductive biologist

Others
 Robert Aitken (publisher) (1734–1802), American publisher
 Robert Aitken (preacher) (1800–1873), Scottish popular preacher
 Robert P. Aitken (1819–1905), American politician 
 Robert Hope Moncrieff Aitken (1826–1887), Scottish army officer and recipient of the Victoria Cross
 Robert Ingersoll Aitken (1878–1949), American sculptor
 Robert Thomas Aitken (1890–1977), American anthropologist
 Robert Aitken (soccer) (1904–1962), American soccer player
 Robert Baker Aitken (1917–2010), American teacher of Zen Buddhism
 Robert Aitken (composer) (born 1939), Canadian flautist and composer
 Roy Aitken (Robert Aitken; born 1958), Scottish footballer
 Robert Campbell Aitken (born 1963), Canadian electrical engineer